"I Believe in You" is a song written by Gene Dunlap and Buddy Cannon, and recorded by American country music artist Mel Tillis. It was released in April 1978 as the first single and title track from the album I Believe in You. The song was Tillis' fourth number one on the country chart. "I Believe in You" stayed at number one for one week and spent a total of fourteen weeks on the country chart. It was also recorded by Engelbert Humperdinck on his 1979 album "This Moment In Time".

Chart performance

References

1978 singles
1978 songs
Mel Tillis songs
Engelbert Humperdinck songs
Songs written by Buddy Cannon
Song recordings produced by Jimmy Bowen
MCA Records singles